Modified may refer to:
Modified (album), the second full-length album by Save Ferris
Modified racing, or "Modifieds", an American automobile racing genre

See also
 Modification (disambiguation)
 Modifier (disambiguation)